Eetion elia, the white-spot palmer, is a butterfly of the family Hesperiidae. It was described by William Chapman Hewitson in 1866. It is found in Malaysia and Singapore, as well as on Sumatra and Borneo. The habitat consists of fringes of secondary forests. It is the only species in the monotypic genus Eetion, erected by Lionel de Nicéville in 1895.

The wingspan is about 38 mm. The wings are dark brown, the forewings with white hyaline (glass-like) spots.

The larvae probably feed on Cleistanthus sumatranus. The larvae create leaf shelters. There are five larval instars. Full-grown larvae have a green body and orange head. They reach a length of about 40 mm. Pupation takes place within the leaf shelter.

References

 "Eetion elia (Hewitson, [1866])". Insecta.pro. Retrieved February 5, 2020.

Butterflies described in 1866
Hesperiinae
Butterflies of Indochina
Taxa named by William Chapman Hewitson